The World War I Aeroplanes Fokker D.VII is an American homebuilt aircraft that was designed by Herbert Kelley and produced by World War I Aeroplanes Inc of Poughkeepsie, New York. When it was available the aircraft was supplied in the form of plans for amateur construction. The aircraft is a replica of the First World War Fokker D.VII fighter aircraft.

Design and development
The Fokker D.VII features a cantilever strut-braced biplane, a single-seat open cockpit, fixed conventional landing gear with a tailskid and a single engine in tractor configuration.

The aircraft fuselage is made from welded steel tubing with the wings constructed from wood, all covered in doped aircraft fabric.

Specifications (Fokker D.VII)

References

Fokker D.VII
1990s United States sport aircraft
Single-engined tractor aircraft
Biplanes
Homebuilt aircraft
Replica aircraft